The Cerro Prieto Fault is a transform fault located in far northern Baja California.  It runs between the Cerro Prieto spreading center located southwest of Mexicali, and the Wagner Basin, another spreading center which lies under the Gulf of California.  These spreading centers are part of the East Pacific Rise, the northern leg of which has formed the Gulf of California by  steadily rifting the Baja California Peninsula away from the mainland of Mexico.

Seismic studies indicate a linear trend of hypocenters to the northwest of Cerro Prieto which is interpreted  as a continuation of the Cerro Prieto Fault some 45 km to the northwest across the international border about 7 km into southern California.

References

Geology of Mexico
Depressions of Mexico
Salton Trough